Nahid Pachai Gäbler (born 7 June 1967 in Kolding, Denmark) is a Tornado World and European Champion and multiple mixed Tornado World and European Champion sailor. Her mother correspondent and interpreter Jette Pachai (father konsul Einar Cohr) was from Fredericia, Denmark and her father Dr. Modjtaba Pachai from Tehran, Iran (who was a Dr. degree in politics/history and worked as military attaché in 2 embassies), the family moved back to Denmark in 1965.

Nahid is married to Olympic Bronze medal Winner and multiple World- and European Champion Roland Gaebler since 16.11.1991.
She has a Bachelor in Economics and a Cand. Merc. Aud. (Master in Audit) from Syddansk Universitet in Kolding.

Results
Danish champion (DGI-Landsmester) in short distance 50 meter freestyle swimming and vice Danish champion in 100 meter backstroke swimming. In 2018 she again wins gold at the Danish Championship DOM-L Masters in 100 m Backstroke, 50 m and 100 m Freestyle.
Since she was 6 years she was also a dedicated dressage and jumping rider and warmblood horse breeder.

In 2005 to 2008 working as sailcoach for Roland Gaebler and Gunnar Struckmann in their last Olympic campaign 2008 in the Tornado class.

In May 2009 Nahid and Roland Gaebler  starts to sail Tornado together, this team is now named Team Gaebler. 
Together they fight to get the multihull and later the Tornado back on the olympic program.

Tornado German Open Champion in 2009, 2011, 2014, 2015 and in 2016.

Tornado German Open Mixed Champion in 2010-2011, 2013-2015.

Open Tornado European Champion in 2013 and 2015.

Open Tornado Vice European Champion in 2010, 2011, 2012, 2014.
 
Tornado Mixed European Champion in 2010, 2011, 2012, 2013, 2014 and in 2015.

Open Tornado World Champion in 2010 in Travemünde, Germany. Nahid and Roland Gaebler writes history and become the first mix team to win a World Championship on a catamaran, and Nahid was the first woman in history to win a World Championship on a catamaran.

Open Tornado Vice World Champion in 2011, 2012, 2013 and 2015.

Open Tornado 3. place World Championship in 2014.
 
Tornado Mixed Global Champion in 2010, 2011, 2012, 2013, 2014 and 2015.

Hurricane 5.9 British Champion 2013 and Best Mix Team 2013  together with skipper John Ready in Weymouth, Great Britain.

Winner of the Euro-Cup Tornado 2015. Winner of the Kiel Week Tornado 2012 in the Audi Sailing Arena, Kiel, Germany. Winner of the Travemünder Week in Tornado in Travemünde, Germany in 2009, 2010 and 2012.

Winner of the Blue Ribbon of Round Fehmarn in 2010.

Winner of the Blue Ribbon race Gorla under 30 foot in 2011  on Ventilo M2 (28 foot catamaran) as mainsailtrimmer and tactician with the boatowner Rolf Hufnagel.

7th place overall at the Blue Ribbon race 47. Kékszalag 2015 at lake Balaton, Hungary with the catamaran Ventilo M2 (28 foot catamaran) from Rolf Hufnagel.

She was tactician on Team Extreme with skipper Roland Gaebler on their Extreme 40 in the Extreme Sailing Series in Cowes and Almeria event in 2011.

In 2013, she and Roland Gaebler becomes part of the German national Olympic team at Sailing Team Germany for the Nacra 17 catamaran class. In the new Olympic Nacra 17 mixed catamaran class, Nahid and Allan Nørregaard were placed number 27. (2.in the silver fleet) in the World Championship in Den Haag in 2013.

References

German female sailors (sport)
1967 births
Living people
Tornado class sailors
Extreme Sailing Series sailors
Tornado class world champions
World champions in sailing for Germany